Ralph Lambton Esq. (c. 1651–1717) was an ancestor of the Earl of Durham.

Lambton was born around 1651 in Chester-Le-Street, Durham, England to Henry Lambton and Mary Davison, and was grandson of Colonel Sir William Lambton (d. 1644).

Lambton had a brother, William (1640–1724).

Lambton married to Dorothy Hedworth was father to:

 Major General John Lambton (1710–1794)
 Henry Lambton MP for Durham (d. 1761)
 Major General Hedworth Lambton (d. 1758)

References

1651 births
1717 deaths
Ralph